Cleilton Eduardo Vicente  or simply Perdigão (born June 28, 1977 in Curitiba) was a defensive midfielder player from Brazil. Played at Vasco and Corinthians.

Honours
Libertadores Cup: 2006
FIFA Club World Championship: 2006
Recopa: 2007

References

External links
 

1977 births
Living people
Brazilian footballers
Brazilian expatriate footballers
Brazil under-20 international footballers
Club Athletico Paranaense players
Sociedade Esportiva e Recreativa Caxias do Sul players
Joinville Esporte Clube players
Clube Náutico Capibaribe players
Clube 15 de Novembro players
Sport Club Internacional players
CR Vasco da Gama players
Sport Club Corinthians Paulista players
C.F. Os Belenenses players
Campeonato Brasileiro Série A players
Campeonato Brasileiro Série B players
Liga Portugal 2 players
Expatriate footballers in Portugal
Footballers from Curitiba

Association football midfielders